The Court of Claims was a federal court that heard claims against the United States government. It was established in 1855, renamed in 1948 to the United States Court of Claims, and abolished in 1982. Then, its jurisdiction was assumed by the newly created United States Court of Appeals for the Federal Circuit and United States Claims Court, which was later renamed the Court of Federal Claims.

Before the Court of Claims was established, monetary claims against the federal government were normally submitted through petitions to Congress. By the time of the Court's creation, the workload had become unwieldy so Congress gave the Court jurisdiction to hear all monetary claims based upon a law, a regulation, or a federal government contract. The Court was required to report its findings to Congress and to prepare bills for payments to claimants whose petitions were approved by the Court. Since only Congress was constitutionally empowered to make appropriations, Congress still had to approve the bills and reports, but it usually did so pro forma.

The Court originally had three judges, who were given lifetime appointments. The judges were authorized to appoint commissioners to take depositions and issue subpoenas. The federal government was represented in the Court by a solicitor appointed by the President.

Establishment of Court
Prior to the establishment of the Court, members of Congress believed that it would be a violation of sovereign immunity and the separation of powers to empower an institution to provide monetary awards from the Treasury. However, over time, the workload related to the assessment of monetary claims became heavier, leading members of Congress to change its interpretation of the Constitution and seek to establish an institution to alleviate the workload.

The Court of Claims was established in 1855 to adjudicate certain claims brought against the United States government by veterans of the Mexican–American War. Initially, the court met at the Willard Hotel, from May to June 1855, when it moved to the US Capitol. There, the court met in the Supreme Court's chamber in the basement of the Capitol until it was given its space to use.

In 1861, Abraham Lincoln in his Annual Message to Congress asked that the court be given the power to issue final judgments. Congress granted the power with the Act of March 3, 1863, and it explicitly allowed the judgments to be appealed to the Supreme Court. However, it also modified the law governing the Court so that its reports and bills were sent to the Department of the Treasury rather than directly to Congress. The moneys to cover these costs were then made a part of the appropriation for the Treasury Department.

The conflict inherent between the two provisions was made manifest when in 1864, the decision in Gordon v. United States was appealed to the Supreme Court. The Supreme Court denied that it had jurisdiction because the decisions of the Court of Claims, hence any appeals, were subject to review by an executive department. Less than a year later, Congress passed a law removing review of the Court of Claims from the Treasury Department.

Tucker Act
In 1887, Congress passed the Tucker Act, which further restricted the claims that could be submitted directly to Congress and required the claims instead to be submitted to the Court of Claims. It broadened the court's jurisdiction so that "claims founded upon the Constitution" could be heard. In particular, this meant that monetary claims based on takings under the eminent domain clause of the Fifth Amendment could be brought before the Court of Claims. The Tucker Act also opened the Court to tax refund suits.

Depredations against American shipping committed by the French during the Quasi-War of 1793 to 1800 led to claims against France that were relinquished by the terms of the Treaty of 1800. Since the claims against France were no longer valid, claimants continually petitioned Congress for the relief that had been waived by the treaty. Only on January 20, 1885, a law was passed, 23 Stat. 283, to provide for consideration of the matter before the Court of Claims. The lead case, Gray v. United States, 21 Ct. Cl. 340, written by Judge John Davis, includes a complete discussion of the historical and political circumstances that led to the hostilities between the United States and France and their resolution by treaty. The cases, termed "French Spoliation Claims", continued in the court until 1915.

In 1925, Congress changed the structure of the Court of Claims by authorizing the Court to appoint seven commissioners who were empowered to hear evidence in judicial proceedings and report on findings of fact. The judges of the Court of Claims would then serve as a board of review for the commissioners.

In 1932, Congress reduced the salary of the judges of the Court of Claims as part of the Legislative Appropriation Act of 1932.  Thomas Sutler Williams was one of the judges of the Court, and he sued the federal government by claiming that his salary could not be cut because the Constitution had specified that judicial salaries could not be reduced. The Supreme Court ruled on Williams v. United States in 1933, deciding that the Court of Claims was an Article I or legislative court and so Congress had the authority to reduce the salaries of the judges of the Court of Claims.

Beginning in 1948, Congress directed that when directed by the court, the commissioner could make recommendations for conclusions of law. Chief Judge Wilson Cowen made that mandatory under the court rules in 1964.

Elevation to Article III status
On July 28, 1953, Congress passed a law to convert the Court of Claims into an Article III court and to raise the number of commissioners to 15. In spite of the Congressional statement of the Court's status, when Judge J. Warren Madden was sitting by designation with the United States Court of Appeals for the Second Circuit, one of the parties asked for the decision to be thrown out on the basis that Madden was not a valid judge in that court. On appeal, the Supreme Court, in Glidden Co. v. Zdanok, held that the Court of Claims was a proper Article III court, and its judges could sit by designation and assignment on other courts. Ironically, the judges could no longer sit on Congressional reference cases because of this change since an independent court could not act in an advisory role to Congress. The solution, enacted by Congress in 1966, was to have the trial judges hear the cases, upon assignment by the chief judge of the trial division.

Two more judges were added to the court in 1966, bringing the total to seven.

Congress terminated the Indian Claims Commission in 1978 and required that any pending cases to be transferred to the Court of Claims. Of the 170 cases so transferred, many were complicated longstanding accounting claims that had been before the Commission for years. One of the most famous of these cases was United States v. Sioux Nation of Indians, which ultimately reached the Supreme Court. Aside from its large judgment awarded to the Sioux, the case also featured interesting questions about judicial power and the ability of Congress to waive the Federal government's legal defense of res judicata to allow a claim to be judicially determined.

Abolition
In 1982, Congress abolished the court, transferring its trial level jurisdiction to the new United States Claims Court, now known as the United States Court of Federal Claims, and its appellate jurisdiction to the equally-new United States Court of Appeals for the Federal Circuit. By then, the Court had expanded to have seven judges; they were transferred to the Federal Circuit.

Former judges

Succession of seats

Notes

References
Books
 
 
 
Journals
 
Websites
 

1855 establishments in Washington, D.C.
1982 disestablishments in Washington, D.C.
Claims
Claims
Aboriginal title in the United States
Federal sovereign immunity in the United States
Courts and tribunals established in 1855
Courts and tribunals disestablished in 1982